is a 1996 Japanese film directed by Toshiharu Ikeda. The film stars Kei Marimura, Makiko Watanabe and Ren Ōsugi. The film was licensed in the US by Central Park Media and was released on DVD and VHS under their Asia Pulp Cinema label.

Plot
An undercover policewoman gets caught up in the underground BDSM world, while investigating a gruesome murder.

Cast
 Kei Marimura as Yu
 Makiko Watanabe as Noriko
 Ren Ōsugi as Tagami
 Minori Terada as Miyamoto
 Atsushi Okuno

English voice cast
The English dub was produced at Audioworks Producers Group in New York City.

 Marcia May as Yu
 Jessica Calvello as Noriko
 Vincent Bagnall as Tagami
 Michael D'R' as Miyamoto
 Mike James as Saito
 Prairie Silva Sabino as Nurse
 Barry Banner

See also 
Naked Killer

External links
 

1996 films
1990s erotic thriller films
Central Park Media
Films directed by Toshiharu Ikeda
Films shot in Japan
Japanese erotic thriller films
Girls with guns films
1990s Japanese films